Baruch Hagai (born 1944) is an Israeli paralympic champion.

Early life
Hagai was born in Tripoli, Libya, to a Jewish family of 13. At the age of two he contracted polio, and five years later his family made aliyah to Israel. The family settled in Tel Aviv, where Hagai was treated for polio in Israel for the first time.  Hagai was trained as a technician, and in the years 1960-2000 he worked as a technician and project manager for a bus-manufacturing factory.

Basketball and table tennis career

He was one of the first to join the Israel Sports Center for the Disabled, in 1960, and was active in wheelchair basketball and in table tennis. Over the years he took part in 224 international basketball games on behalf of the Israeli national team and 66 international games on behalf of the Center. In table tennis he won four consecutive gold medals at the Paralympic Games.

Following his retirement, Hagai joined the Sports Center as head coach.

Awards
In 1986, Hagai was declared as a "Man of Peace" on behalf of the International Olympic Committee.

In 2001, he was awarded with the Israel Prize, for sports, in recognition of his long years of excellence in disabled sports.

See also
List of Israel Prize recipients

References

External links
 
 Hagai on the Israel Sports Center for the Disabled website

Living people
1944 births
Libyan Jews
Libyan emigrants to Israel
Israeli Jews
Israel Prize in sport recipients
Israeli male swimmers
Israeli male wheelchair racers
Israeli men's wheelchair basketball players
Israeli table tennis players
Paralympic swimmers of Israel
Israeli people of Libyan-Jewish descent
Jewish swimmers
Swimmers at the 1964 Summer Paralympics
Paralympic wheelchair basketball players of Israel
Wheelchair basketball players at the 1968 Summer Paralympics
Wheelchair basketball players at the 1988 Summer Paralympics
Paralympic table tennis players of Israel
Table tennis players at the 1964 Summer Paralympics
Table tennis players at the 1968 Summer Paralympics
Table tennis players at the 1972 Summer Paralympics
Table tennis players at the 1976 Summer Paralympics
Paralympic athletes of Israel
Athletes (track and field) at the 1964 Summer Paralympics
Athletes (track and field) at the 1968 Summer Paralympics
Athletes (track and field) at the 1972 Summer Paralympics
Paralympic gold medalists for Israel
Paralympic bronze medalists for Israel
Wheelchair category Paralympic competitors
Medalists at the 1964 Summer Paralympics
Medalists at the 1968 Summer Paralympics
Medalists at the 1972 Summer Paralympics
Medalists at the 1976 Summer Paralympics
Medalists at the 1980 Summer Paralympics
Male table tennis players
People from Tripoli, Libya
Paralympic medalists in wheelchair basketball
Paralympic medalists in table tennis
Paralympic medalists in swimming